Birch Mountains Wildland Provincial Park is a wildland provincial park in Wood Buffalo, northern Alberta, Canada. It contains a free roaming wood bison herd.

The area has a remarkably diverse ecosystem that supports lake trout, lake whitefish, cisco, Arctic grayling, walleye, and yellow perch; osprey and bald eagles; and many more. The rare, spore-bearing plant quillwort was discovered in the area in 2004.

The Wildland contains . It is accessible only by fly-in during the summer and by snowmobile during the winter. There are two commercial backcountry lodges in the park: Namur Lake Lodge and Island Lake Lodge. Hiking, fishing, camping, hunting, ice fishing, and on-site OHV riding are welcome.

See also
List of provincial parks in Alberta
List of Canadian provincial parks
List of National Parks of Canada

References

Parks and Protected Areas
http://gateway.cd.gov.ab.ca/siteinformation.aspx?id=374 Birch Mountains Wildland Park

Parks in Alberta
Regional Municipality of Wood Buffalo
Mountain ranges of Alberta